Trulioo is a Canadian-based company that provides electronic identity and address verification of both individuals and businesses. Trulioo customers use the service to verify the identity of their own customers as part of 'Know Your Customer' verification. It began as a service to Facebook in 2012 and as of 2014 includes verification for Google and LinkedIn.

History

Trulioo was founded by Stephen Ufford and Tanis Jorge. Both previously worked together on three startups in the consumer credit industry, with Ufford as CEO and Jorge as COO of Pharos Global Strategies. They also held similar positions with iQuiri.com and NCB Data, both of which were sold to FreeCreditReport.com and Experian respectively.

HelloFlow Acquisition
In February 2022 Trulioo acquired HelloFlow, a Denmark-based firm offering a no-code, drag-and-drop solution for client onboarding monitoring, and digital workflow. 

GlobalGateway update
In June of 2022, Trulioo released upgrades to their flagship identity verification platform including AML Watchlist Screening and Business Verification services. New to the platform is a proof-of-address service via utility providers, called UtilityID.

Customers

 Regulated entities such as financial service providers, wealth management, brokerages, family offices, remittance providers, payment service providers and banks (traditional and challenger).

 Cryptocurrency exchanges and wallets

 Marketplaces and communities

 Age-restricted platforms and services such as gaming (online gambling)

References

Companies based in Vancouver
2011 establishments in British Columbia
Identity management systems